The Harry and Jeanette Weinberg Center for Elder Justice at The Hebrew Home at Riverdale is an elder abuse prevention and intervention program that provides shelter for older adults who have experienced abuse in the community.

History
The Weinberg Center was launched as the nation's first regional elder abuse shelter by The Hebrew Home at Riverdale in 2005, filling a critical gap in direct services available for older adults who have experienced domestic violence. Since 2005, the Weinberg Center has expanded in the fields of elder abuse and elder justice.

Services
Elder abuse—a rapidly growing epidemic for many people who are 60 and older—impacts a population with special needs, often involving cognitive and physical deficits that are not and cannot be met effectively in traditional shelters. A unique model based within an existing long-term care facility, the Weinberg Center offers its clients holistic care including a safe and secure environment and a full continuum of medical, psychological, therapeutic, social, and financial services. Every client has a uniquely tailored action plan created and executed by the Weinberg Center team in order to help each client heal, become empowered, and reach their specific goals.

Outreach and Training
The Weinberg Center offers training and community outreach programs with the intention of increasing professional and public awareness about the signs and symptoms of elder abuse and neglect. The organization actively seeks out individuals who may be of support to elderly individuals, such as doctors, pharmacists, financial service and banking professionals, social workers, case managers, home care workers, police officers, lawyers, judges, community members, doormen, and older adults themselves.

Thought Leadership
The Weinberg Center, in addition to providing critical direct service and community outreach and training, also serves as a living laboratory that provides unique insight into best practices and gaps in service within the field of elder justice at large. Since inception, the Weinberg Center has incorporated a strong research component that has increasingly propelled a much broader span of education, outreach, and advocacy work that both improve outcomes for shelter clients while simultaneously advancing the elder justice field on a state, national, and global level.

SPRiNG Alliance
As the Weinberg Center's initiative to create elder abuse shelters has continued to gain momentum, the Weinberg Center established the SPRiNG (Shelter Partners: Regional, National, Global) Alliance, a professional shelter network to lend structure to ongoing shelter-creation efforts. The SPRiNG Alliance's mission is to create a network of regional elder abuse shelters and other similar service models and provide them with close working relationships, shared resources and technical assistance, common standards of excellence, and a vibrant community of support. The Alliance currently conducts monthly phone calls, maintains a website with shared resources, and leads an annual symposium with its partners.

References

Domestic violence-related organizations in the United States
Counseling organizations
Seniors' organizations
Non-profit organizations based in the Bronx